Susann Singer (born 19 January 1970) is a German judoka. She competed in the women's half-middleweight event at the 1996 Summer Olympics.

References

1970 births
Living people
German female judoka
Olympic judoka of Germany
Judoka at the 1996 Summer Olympics
Sportspeople from Leipzig